The Akron Zips football program is a college football team that represents the University of Akron (formerly known as Buchtel College). The team has had 27 head coaches since it began playing organized football in 1891. Among those coaches, only Gordon K. Larson, Jim Dennison, J.D. Brookhart, and current head coach Terry Bowden have led Akron to postseason appearances. Brookhart is the only coach to win a conference championship with the Zips; he won the Mid-American Conference in 2005. Dennison is the school's all-time leader in games won and seasons coached.

Key

Coaches

Notes

References
General

 
 

Specific

Akron

Akron Zips head football coaches